Thomas Vedel Kvist (born 18 August 1987) is a Danish former road bicycle racer, who competed as a professional between 2009 and 2011.

He signed as a professional on 1 August 2008 after an amateur career that included winning a stage and the final standings of the Coupe des nations Ville Saguenay in Canada for the Beveren 2000 team.

Major results

2004
 7th Overall Oberösterreich Juniorenrundfahrt
 7th Overall Int. 3-Etappen-Rundfahrt
2005
 1st  Overall Giro della Lunigiana
1st Stage 3
 1st  Overall GP Général Patton
 1st Stage 1 Trofeo Karlsberg
 2nd Overall UCI Junior Road World Cup
 4th Overall Liège–La Gleize
 5th Overall Tour du Pays de Vaud
1st Stage 2
 6th Overall Course de la Paix Juniors
2006
 8th La Côte Picarde
2007
 5th Circuit de Wallonie
 6th Overall GP Tell
2008
 1st  Overall Coupe des nations Ville Saguenay
1st Stage 5
 3rd Overall Tour de Liège
1st Stage 2
 5th Kattekoers
2011
 1st Stage 4 Rhône-Alpes Isère Tour
 3rd Overall Kreiz Breizh Elites
 10th Overall Tour de Normandie
1st Stage 2
 10th Himmerland Rundt

References

External links

Danish male cyclists
1987 births
Living people
People from Odder Municipality
Sportspeople from the Central Denmark Region